Stephen John Wooler CB (born 16 March 1948) is an English Barrister who was HM Chief Inspector to the Crown Prosecution Service (1999–2010).

Career
Wooler was born on 16 March 1948, the son of Herbert George Wooler and Mable Wooler.  He was educated at Bedford Modern School and University College London.

In 1969, Wooler was called to the bar at Gray's Inn, initially in practice at the Common Law Bar (1970–73).  In 1973 he joined the Office of Director of Public Prosecutions, eventually becoming HM Chief Inspector to the Crown Prosecution Service (1999–2010).  In 2009 he was made a member of the board of the Institute of Criminal Law at University College London and, in 2005, was made Companion Order of the Bath.

In 1974 Wooler married Jonquil Elizabeth Wilmshurst-Smith.  They have a son and a daughter.

References

Companions of the Order of the Bath
People educated at Bedford Modern School
Alumni of University College London
Members of Gray's Inn
1948 births
Living people
English barristers